Gråt Fader Berg och spela (Cry, Father Berg, and Play) is No. 12 in the Swedish poet and performer Carl Michael Bellman's 1790 song collection, Fredman's Epistles. 
The epistle is subtitled "Elegi över Slagsmålet på Gröna Lund" ("Elegy on the Battle at Gröna Lund [Tavern]"). It is a lament over a pub brawl, caused by Fredman's drinking a soldier's beer and dancing with someone else's girlfriend. Set to the melody from the aria "The flocks shall leave the mountains" in George Frideric Handel's opera Acis and Galatea, it is the best-known of his poems describing the consequences of brandy-drinking. Bellman used the contrast between the romantic associations of the melody and the brutal reality of heavy drinking to humorous effect.

Context

Song

Music and verse form 

The epistle was written in the summer of 1770, and set to a melody from the aria "The flocks shall leave the mountains" in George Frideric Handel's 1718 opera Acis and Galatea. There are four stanzas, each of twelve lines. The rhyming scheme is ABBA-CCEF-CFCF.

Lyrics 

The epistle, like all of Fredman's Epistles, was first published in 1790, towards the end of Bellman's life: he died in 1795. It was No. 12 in the book, and was subtitled "Elegi över Slagsmålet på Gröna Lund" ("Elegy on the Battle at Gröna Lund [Tavern]"). The corpus of epistles did not change after that, though the book has been reprinted repeatedly and translated into other European languages.

In the text, Fredman, accompanied by Father Berg on flute, begins in accordance with a pattern from classical elegies and meditates on the greatness of the past and the ravages of time. It becomes clear that a drinking-place, Stockholm's Gröna Lund Tavern, has been smashed up in a fight. The epistle narrates in a naive preaching style that Fredman, drunk, has taken a soldier's beer and danced with someone else's girl. The song derives its effect from the contrast between the clear melody with its elegiac touch, and harsh reality.

Reception 

The musicologist James Massengale writes that although the melody was borrowed, the amount of work that Bellman had to put into the music for this epistle, as for no. 24 ("Kära Syster!") was "surely tantamount to the production of new melodies." Borrowing was accepted, even encouraged at the time, but the "poetic possibility", Massengale suggests, is that Bellman wished to exploit the humorous contrast between a melody of one type and a story of another, or between an existing image associated with the melody, and a fresh one presented in an epistle. In addition, Bellman was able to use what his audience knew to be borrowed music to reinforce the historical flavour of the epistles, introducing exactly the kind of ambiguity that he was seeking.

The translator and Bellman's biographer Paul Britten Austin calls the epistle "the most famous of the poems lamenting the violent effects of brandy". He finds it "surprising" that Bellman has chosen to take an aria from Handel's Acis and Galatea, but notes that by marking it lamentabile and "cunningly interweav[ing] a flute obbligato with the vocal phrases", he manages to create a "tragi-comic picture".

Carina Burman writes in her biography of Bellman that the tune of the epistle was one of several that Bellman borrowed from Handel's heroic pastoral opera. In the aria, a trio, the two lovers sing of their eternal love "while the jealous Polyphemus mumbles threats". The audience in his day were well aware of that dramatic context, so hearing the melody as a backdrop to the sharply contrasting situation of a pub brawl created a powerfully comic effect.

The song has been recorded by Sven-Bertil Taube on his 1959 album Fredmans epistlar och sånger, Martin Bagge, by Fred Åkerström with Katarina Fritzén and Orjan Larson on his 1974 album Glimmande Nymf, by Peter Ekberg Pelz on his 1985 album C. M. Bellman, and by Mikael Samuelsson on his 1988 album Carl Michael Bellman.

References

Sources

 
 
 
  (contains the most popular Epistles and Songs, in Swedish, with sheet music)
  (with facsimiles of sheet music from first editions in 1790, 1791)

External links 

 Text of Epistle 12 at Bellman.net

1770 compositions 
Swedish songs
Fredmans epistlar